Nemognatha chrysomeloides is a species of oil beetle (Meloidae) endemic to Central and South America.

Ecology
Nemognatha chrysomeloides is a parasite of Melitoma marginella and M. segmentaria from Mexico to Argentina. Both N. chrysomeloides and Melitoma are restricted to the same host plant – Ipomoea – and so the rate of parasitism may be comparatively high.

Taxonomy
Nemognatha chrysomeloides was first described by Carl Linnaeus in his 1763 work , under the name Meloe chrysomeloides. It is a very variable species, and as such, many synonyms have since been published:
Cantharis chrysomeloides (Linnaeus, 1763): Thunberg, 1784
Lytta chrysomeloides (Linnaeus, 1763): Schoenherr, 1817
Nemognathus coeruleipennis Perty, 1830
Nemognatha versicolor Chevrolat, 1834
Nemognatha abdominalis Lucas in Laporte de Castelnau, 1859
Nemognatha bicolor Lucas in Laporte de Castelnau, 1859 (non LeConte, 1853; nec Walker, 1866) 
Nematognatha lucasi Gemminger, 1870
Nemognatha atra Beauregard, 1890 (non Zonitis atrum Schwartz, 1808; nec Gnathium atrum Dugès, 1889)
Nemognatha coeruleipennis var. fulviventris Beauregard, 1890
Nemognatha pallidicollis Beauregard, 1890
Nemognatha violacea Beauregard, 1890
Nemognatha beauregardi Pic, 1910 (replacement name for N. atra Beauregard, 1890)
Zonitis chrysomeloides (Linnaeus, 1763): Denier, 1935
Zonitis beauregardi (Pic, 1910): Blackwelder, 1945
Nemognatha chrysomeloides ab. markli Kaszab, 1963

References

Meloidae
Beetles described in 1763
Beetles of South America
Taxa named by Carl Linnaeus